The 1976 Olympia bombing was a bomb attack on 27 March 1976 carried out by the Provisional IRA at the Olympia exhibition centre in west London. A  bomb exploded in a litter bin at the top of an escalator inside the centre, which at the time was crowded with 20,000 people attending the Daily Mail's Ideal Home Exhibition. 85 people were injured and 4 people lost limbs. One casualty, 79-year-old Rachel Hyams, died from her injuries 21 days later. Police said they received no coded warning from the IRA, but the Sunday Mirror in Manchester said it received a call from the Provisional IRA's “Irish Brigade” claiming responsibility. Due to the outrage caused, the IRA temporarily halted its bombing campaign in Britain.

See also
Chronology of Provisional Irish Republican Army actions (1970–79)
Cannon Street train bombing
West Ham station attack

References

Olympia bombing
Olympia bombing
Olympia bombing
Olympia bombing
Olympia bombing
20th century in the London Borough of Hammersmith and Fulham
Olympia bombing
Olympia bombing
Olympia bombing
Olympia London
Provisional IRA bombings in London
Olympia bombing
Building bombings in London